Hockey Club Atlant Moscow Oblast was a Russian professional ice hockey team based in Mytishchi, Moscow Oblast. They were members of the Bobrov Division of the Kontinental Hockey League in the 2014–15 season, but have not been active since the 2015–16 season due to financial issues.

History

Overview
Atlant was founded in 2005 when a team (Khimik) based in Voskresensk was relocated to Mytishchi. The old team traced its history back to 1953. Immediate success allowed Khimik to play in the Championship of the Soviet Union. Leading the team was playing-coach Nikolay Epshtein. In three years, Khimik was graduated to the top league of the Soviet Union. Three bronze medal results between 1965 and 1984 were capitulated in 1989 when the team achieved silver under prestigious head coach Vladimir Vasiliyev, a major accomplishment for a team from a small town. More impressive is how much successful homegrown talent has come out of the Khimik system, withs names including future Stanley Cup winners such as Igor Larionov and Valeri Kamensky.

In the spring of 1998, the status of the team changed, representing not only the city of Voskresensk but also the entire Moscow Oblast. This event took place on their 45th anniversary. During the 2005–06 season, the team relocated within the Moscow Oblast, from Voskresensk to Mytishchi. Following this, the team changed its name to Atlant, prior to its inclusion in the Kontinental Hockey League (KHL). Their new team logo features a Central Asian Shepherd Dog.

Recent history
Atlant signed NHL goaltender Ray Emery to a single year contract on July 9, 2008. The deal was reportedly worth in excess of $2 million, plus bonuses.

Atlant and Emery had several issues, including Emery attacking the team trainer and his temporary refusal to return to the team after the KHL break over a contract dispute. Emery was upset that his pay was in rubles that were not inflation protected. He returned to the team shortly after  to play the remainder of the season.

Honors

Champions
 Pajulahti Cup (1): 2007

Runners-up
 Gagarin Cup (1): 2011

Season-by-season KHL records
Note: GP = Games played, W = Wins, L = Losses, OTW = Overtime/shootout wins, OTL = Overtime/shootout losses, Pts = Points, GF = Goals for, GA = Goals against

Players

Notable alumni

Hall-of-Famers

Players
Igor Larionov, C, 1978–81, inducted 2008

Triple Gold Club
Players
Valeri Kamensky, LW, 1982–85, inducted June 10, 1996, Stanley Cup win vs. Florida Panthers
Igor Larionov, C, 1978–81, inducted June 7, 1997, Stanley Cup win vs. Philadelphia Flyers

Scoring Champions
Dmitri Kvartalnov: 1989–90
Roman Oksiuta: 1991–92
Sergei Mozyakin: 2007–08, 2008–09, 2009–10

First round draft picks
 2009:   Yevgeny Molotilov (11th overall), Stefan Stepanov (20th overall) and Alexander Shevchenko (21st overall)
 2010:   none
 2011:   Arseni Khatsey (9th overall) and Artur Gavrus (18th overall)

List of Khimik/Atlant players selected in the NHL Entry Draft
 1989:  Roman Oksiuta (New York Rangers) (202th overall)
 1990:  Vyacheslav Kozlov (Detroit Red Wings) (45th overall), Valeri Zelepukin (New Jersey Devils) (221st overall), Sergei Selyanin (Winnipeg Jets) (224th overall)
 1991: Igor Ulanov (Winnipeg Jets) (203th overall)
 1992: Alexander Cherbayev (San Jose Sharks) (51st overall), Evgeny Garanin (Winnipeg Jets) (228th overall)
 1994: Sergei Berezin (Toronto Maple Leafs) (256th overall)
 1998: Andrei Markov (Montreal Canadiens) (162nd overall), Yevgeny Pastukh St. Louis Blues (225th overall), Andrei Yershov (Chicago Blackhawks) (240th overall)
 2001: Evgeny Gamalei (New Jersey Devils) (257th overall)
 2003: Dmitri Chernykh (New Jersey Devils) (48th overall)

References

External links
Atlant Official Website 

 
Ice hockey teams in Russia
Ice hockey in Moscow Oblast
Former Kontinental Hockey League teams
Ice hockey clubs established in 2005
2005 establishments in Russia
Ice hockey clubs disestablished in 2015
2015 disestablishments in Russia